The 2014–15 Stanford Cardinal men's basketball team represented Stanford University during the 2014–15 NCAA Division I men's basketball season. The Cardinal, led by seventh year head coach Johnny Dawkins, played their home games at Maples Pavilion and were members of the Pac-12 Conference. They finished the season 24–13, 9–9 in Pac-12 play to finish in a tie for fifth place. They advanced to the quarterfinals of the Pac-12 tournament where they lost to Utah. They were invited to the National Invitation Tournament where they defeated UC Davis, Rhode Island, Vanderbilt, Old Dominion, and Miami (FL) to become NIT Champions. It was Stanford's second NIT Championship in four years.

Previous season
The 2013–14 Stanford Cardinal finished the season with an overall record of 23–13, and 10–8 in the Pac-12 to finish in a five-way tie for third place. In the 2014 Pac-12 tournament, the team defeated Washington State and Arizona State before losing to UCLA, 59–84 in the semifinals. The Cardinal received an at-large bid to the 2014 NCAA tournament as a #10–seed in the South Region. The Cardinal made it to the Sweet 16 by defeating #7–seed New Mexico and #2–seed Kansas, before losing to #11–seed Dayton 72–82.

Off-season

Departures

2014 recruiting class

Roster

Notes
 On December 28, 2014, Sophomore center Schuyler Rimmer announced on his Twitter that he would be transferring to Florida.

Schedule

|-
!colspan=12 style="background:#8C1515; color:white;"| Exhibition

|-
!colspan=12 style="background:#8C1515; color:white;"| Regular season

|-
!colspan=12 style="background:#8C1515;"| Pac-12 tournament

|-
!colspan=12 style="background:#8C1515;"| NIT

Ranking movement

References

Stanford
Stanford Cardinal men's basketball seasons
Stanford
National Invitation Tournament championship seasons
Stanford Cardinal men's basketball team
Stanford Cardinal men's basketball team